Knut Müller (born 21 March 1974) is a Norwegian ski jumper.

He made his FIS Ski Jumping World Cup debut in January 1991 in Oberhof. He collected his first World Cup points at the Holmenkollen ski festival in March 1991 with a 26th place, later adding a 23rd place in January 1992 and 24th in January 1993. His last World Cup outing came in January 1995 in Sapporo.

He represented the sports club Asker SK.

References 

1974 births
Living people
People from Asker
Norwegian male ski jumpers
Sportspeople from Viken (county)
20th-century Norwegian people